Kenneth Alan Blackburn (born 13 May 1951) is an English former professional footballer who played as a centre forward in the Football League for Brighton & Hove Albion.

Born in Wembley, Middlesex, and raised in the west of England, Blackburn played both rugby and football to representative level as a schoolboy. He played for Cheltenham Town as a youngster, joined Brighton & Hove Albion as an apprentice, and made his debut on 3 March 1969 in the Third Division, scoring the last-minute winner away to Shrewsbury Town. That was his only first-team appearance. He turned professional in May 1969, but was released at the end of the following season and went on to play non-league football for clubs including Dover and Gloucester City. He took up coaching, and spent 19 years as head of youth football at Gloucester City before taking up a similar role at Tuffley Rovers in 2018.

References

1951 births
Living people
Footballers from Wembley
English footballers
Association football forwards
Brighton & Hove Albion F.C. players
Dover F.C. players
Gloucester City A.F.C. players
English Football League players
Southern Football League players